Telescopus, the Old World catsnakes, is a genus of 12 species of mildly venomous opisthoglyphous snakes in the family Colubridae.

Geographic range
Species of the genus Telescopus are found from the Balkans and Pakistan through to southern and western Africa, plus two species in northern Eurasia.

Description
The genus Telescopus is characterised by having a slender slightly flattened cylindrical body and attaining a total length (including tail) of between 80–180 cm (about 2.5–6 feet).  They have medium-large eyes with vertical pupils, a typical feature of nocturnal reptiles, and have smooth dorsal scales. The dentition of the genus is as follows; typically 10–12 maxillary teeth, with a space before a pair of grooved fangs at the rear of the mouth, approximately level with the eyes.  The anterior mandibular teeth are usually longer than the posterior mandibular teeth, perhaps to aid the arboreal species in catching and holding prey whilst in trees. The species are mostly drab, spotted snakes, but include the spectacular tiger snake (T. semiannulatus), which is orange in color with black saddles along its back.

Habitat and Behaviour
The genus Telescopus includes both arboreal and terrestrial species, and can be found from sea level up to 2,000 metres (about 6,600 feet) above sea level. They are nocturnal hunting snakes with a distinct head and large eyes.

Diet
The primary prey species of Telescopus are small lizards, including geckos, although some members of the genus may occasionally prey on small birds, rodents and amphibians.

Reproduction
All species in the genus Telescopus are oviparous, laying clutches of 5-15 eggs.

Venom
All species in the genus Telescopus are venomous, with the venom being of a neurotoxic nature; however, they are not considered particularly harmful to man.  This is because the opisthoglyphous venom-delivery system is not as efficient as the delivery systems found in Elapidae and Viperidae.  However, some members of the genus Telescopus such as T. dhara have particularly large venom glands, and the venom toxicity in some species has been compared to that of the Acanthophis species.  For these reasons, it is advisable that all Telescopus species be handled with caution.  It is also important to consider that allergic reactions are possible after a bite, and such reactions would significantly worsen the effects of an envenomation.

Species

Telescopus beetzi (Barbour, 1922) - Beetz's tiger snake, Namib tiger snake
Telescopus dhara (Forskål, 1775)
Telescopus fallax (Fleischmann, 1831)
Telescopus finkeldeyi Haacke, 2013 - Damara tiger snake
Telescopus gezirae Broadley, 1994
Telescopus hoogstraali K.P. Schmidt & Marx, 1956
Telescopus nigriceps (Ahl, 1924)
Telescopus obtusus (Reuss, 1834) - Egyptian catsnake
Telescopus pulcher (Scortecci, 1935)
Telescopus rhinopoma (Blanford, 1874) 
Telescopus semiannulatus A. Smith, 1849
Telescopus tessellatus (Wall, 1908) - checkered catsnake
Telescopus tripolitanus (F. Werner, 1908)
Telescopus variegatus (J.T. Reinhardt, 1843)

Nota bene: A binomial authority in parentheses indicates that the species was originally described in a genus (Tarbophis) other than Telescopus

References

Further reading
Wagler J (1830). Natürliches System der Amphibien, mit vorangehender Classification des Säugthiere und Vögel. Ein Beitrag zur vergleichenden Zoologie. Munich, Stuttgart, and Tübingen: J.G. Cotta. vi + 354 pp. + 1 plate. (Genus Telescopus, p. 182). (in German and Latin).

External links
Crochet P-A, Rasmussen JB, Wilms T, Geniez P, Trape J-F, Böhme W (2008). "Systematic status and correct nomen of the western North African cat snake: Telescopus tripolitanus (Werner, 1909) (Serpentes: Colubridae), with comments on the other taxa in the dhara-obtusus group". Zootaxa 1703: 25-46.(Abstract)

 
Snake genera
Taxa named by Johann Georg Wagler
Taxonomy articles created by Polbot